The 1951 Roller Hockey World Cup was the seventh roller hockey world cup, organized by the Fédération Internationale de Patinage a Roulettes (now under the name of Fédération Internationale de Roller Sports). It was contested by 11 national teams (all from Europe) and it is also considered the 1951 European Roller Hockey Championship. All the games were played in the city of Barcelona, in Spain, the chosen city to host the World Cup.

Results

Standings

See also
 FIRS Roller Hockey World Cup
CERH European Roller Hockey Championship

External links
 1951 World Cup in rink-hockey.net historical database

Roller Hockey World Cup
International roller hockey competitions hosted by Spain
1951 in Spanish sport
1951 in roller hockey